In 1999, 1. deild was the top tier league in Faroe Islands football (since 2005, the top tier has been the Faroe Islands Premier League, with 1. deild becoming the second tier).

This article details the statistics of 1. deild in the 1999 season.

Overview
It was contested by 10 teams, and KÍ Klaksvík won the championship.

League standings

Results
The schedule consisted of a total of 18 games. Each team played two games against every opponent in no particular order. One of the games was at home and one was away.

Top goalscorers
Source: 

17 goals
 Jákup á Borg (B36)

16 goals
 John Petersen (B36)

13 goals
 Kurt Mørkøre (KÍ)

12 goals
 Eli Hentze (B71)
 Henning Jarnskor (GÍ)

11 goals
 Aleksandar Radosavljević (GÍ)

10 goals
 Nebojša Veljković (Sumba)
 Rógvi Jacobsen (KÍ)
 Súni Fríði Barbá (HB)

8 goals
 Marcello Marcelino (B68)

References

1. deild seasons
Faroe
Faroe
1